The 1937–38 Cornell Big Red men's ice hockey season was the 31st season of play for the program. The teams was coached by Nick Bawlf in his 16th season.

Season
Cornell commenced its season on January 4 while the ice was still too thin for the temporary boards to be set up. The team scheduled its first game in mid-January so it would have a couple of weeks to practice together ahead of the match, a luxury the Big Red rarely possessed in recent years. The first game of the season, a contest against Columbia, was cancelled at the last minute, leaving Cornell with two games prior to the semester break. The opening game came against Colgate and the Maroons got the better of the Big Red once again. The team had to fix its problems quickly as the second game was just three days away. Unfortunately, Cornell was hopelessly outmatched by Clarkson and embarrassed to the tune of 0–10.

Cornell had to live with that loss for a full month before their next game. A rematch with Clarkson that was to be played on the 10th was cancelled due to weather. The temperature got so bad that even the rematch with Colgate had to be scrapped. Cornell ended up having to finish its season on the road and the lack of available ice for practice proved disastrous. The Big Red lost a pair of 1-goal games and ended the year without a loss, producing their worst season in 25 years.

Roster

Standings

Schedule and results

|-
!colspan=12 style=";" | Regular Season

References

Cornell Big Red men's ice hockey seasons
Cornell
Cornell
Cornell
Cornell